Bathroom singing, also known as singing in the bathroom, singing in the bath, or singing in the shower, is a widespread phenomenon. 

Many people sing in the bathroom because the hard wall surfaces, often tiles or wooden panels, and lack of soft furnishings, create an aurally pleasing acoustic environment.

Scientific explanation 
The multiple reflections from walls enrich the sound of one's voice. Small dimensions and hard surfaces of a typical bathroom produce various kinds of standing waves, reverberation and echoes, giving the voice "fullness and depth."

This habit was reported (with an attempt of explanations) centuries ago. For example, Ibn Khaldun in Chapter 1 of his Muqaddimah writes:

In popular culture 
The bathroom singer is an ironic reference to mediocre or amateur singers. Music professionals, however, have also connected with the particular acoustices of the bathroom. Jon Anderson of Yes, for instance, had tiles installed in the studio, to simulate the echo effect of one's vocals in a bathroom. And Paul Simon wrote:

"Weird Al" Yankovic in 1979 recorded his first single, "My Bologna," in the bathroom across from the California Polytechnic State University student radio station where he was DJing at the time. "There's More to Life Than This", the fourth track on Björk's 1993 album Debut, was recorded live in the toilets of the Milk Bar clubnight, London.

The retro string band R. Crumb & His Cheap Suit Serenaders recorded a song called "Singing in the Bathtub" for their third album, released in 1978.

See also 
 Room modes
 Acoustic resonance
 Voice frequency

References

Notes

Sources consulted 
 Jearl Walker, The Flying Circus of Physics

Singing
Habits
Bathrooms